Francesc Mulet (1624–1675) was a Spanish writer. He wrote Tractat del pet (Fart Treaty) and two comedias: Los amors de Melissenda and La infanta Tellina i el rei Matarot.

Writers from the Valencian Community
1624 births
1675 deaths